Runner's rump is a cutaneous condition characterized by a small ecchymoses in upper gluteal cleft caused by constant friction with each stride when running.

See also 
 Tennis toe
 Painful fat herniation
 List of cutaneous conditions

References 

Skin conditions resulting from physical factors